is a Japanese actress and gravure idol. She married actor Shigenori Yamazaki on November 11, 2016.

Filmography

Musicals
Rock Musical Bleach as Orihime Inoue
Rock Musical Bleach Saien as Orihime Inoue

Movies
Love My Life as Ichiko Izumiya

Television
Rosetta: The Masked Angel (1998) as Asuka Jin / Masked Angel Rosetta 
Ultraman Nexus (2004) as Nanaka
Garo: Makai no Hana (2014) as Akari
Kamen Rider Drive (2014) as Rinna Sawagami
Kishiryu Sentai Ryusoulger (2019) as Kyōko Taniguchi

References

External links
 Hori agency official site

Living people
Japanese actresses
Japanese gravure idols
1982 births